Thordis Brandt (born 1940) is a German-American actress.

Personal life
Thordis Brandt was born on September 7, 1940, in Germany of Norwegian and German parents. She moved to Canada as a young girl and was raised initially at a farm in St. Norbert, Manitoba, then moved to a mink ranch in Bella Coola, British Columbia, then to Vancouver in 1958. In 1963, Thordis graduated as a registered nurse from St. Paul's Hospital School of Nursing.

She moved to Santa Monica, California, where she continued to practice her nursing in private duty. One of her jobs in private duty was serving actress Patricia Neal. Neal recommended Thordis to other actors and actresses and Thordis became known as the "actor's nurse". Thordis began her career as a nurse advisor in Ben Casey where she made appearances on the show.

After retiring from acting, she continued nursing in Beverly Hills.

Career
A bit player for most of her career, she appeared in such TV shows as Burke's Law, The Girl from UNCLE, The Man from UNCLE, The Green Hornet, Mannix, and Hogan's Heroes, as well as the 1967 episode of The Fugitive "The One That Got Away". Although she had some speaking parts, Thordis' appearances rarely required her to speak.

She also appeared in films beginning with The Last of the Secret Agents? and Nevada Smith (both 1966), then In Like Flint (1967) and Funny Girl (1968). She appeared in two Elvis Presley films Spinout (1966) and Live a Little, Love a Little (1968).  She has gained minor cult status as the victim of a serial killer in the made-for-TV movie Dragnet 1966, and her appearances in the films The Witchmaker (1969) and Up Your Teddy Bear (1970).

References

External links
 

1940 births
20th-century American women
American television actresses
German emigrants to Canada
German emigrants to the United States
German people of Norwegian descent
Living people